Clavatulidae is a taxonomic family of sea snails, marine gastropod mollusks in the superfamily Conoidea. The family is not well differentiated morphologically.

Clavatulidae was raised, based on cladistic analysis, from subfamily to the family level by Rosenberg in 1998. It is no longer regarded as a subfamily of Turridae by several malacologists (Kantor, Sysoev). This family has no subfamilies.

General characteristics
This family consists of species with a medium-sized to rather large, fusiform shell. The oblong, pointed spire is rather high. The aperture is oval and mostly white. The operculum has a medio-lateral nucleus. The siphonal canal varies between rather short (e.g. Pusionella compacta) to moderately long  and slightly incurved (e.g. Fusiturris undatiruga). The anal sinus varies from very shallow to rather deep. The outer lip can be slightly incurved and serrated on its side. The subsutural ramp is usually well developed. The sculpture of the shell in this family shows various forms, going from a rather smooth surface (e.g. Gemmuloborsonia colorata) to being finely ribbed longitudinally and striated transversally. The stenoglossan radula has the formula 1-(1-R-1)-1

Genera
Genera in the family Clavatulidae include:
 Benthoclionella  Kilburn, 1974
 Caliendrula Kilburn, 1985
 Clavatula Lamarck, 1801
 Clionella Gray, 1847
 †Hemisurcula Casey, 1904
 Makiyamaia Kuroda, 1961
 †Orthosurcula T. L. Casey, 1904
 Pagodaturris Kantor, Fedosov & Puillandre, 2018
 Paraclavatula Kantor, Horro, Rolán & Puillandre, 2018
 Perrona Schumacher, 1817
 Pusionella Gray, 1847
 Scaevatula Gofas, 1990
 Tomellana Wenz, 1943
 Toxiclionella Powell, 1966
 Trachydrillia Nolf & Swinnen, 2010
 Turricula Schumacher, 1817
 Genera moved to other families
 Danilacarina Bozzetti, 1997, moved to Cochlespiridae
 Iwaoa Kuroda, 1953, moved to Horaiclavidae
Genera brought into synonymy
 Melatoma Swainson, 1840: synonym of Clionella Gray, 1847
 Netrum Philippi, 1850: synonym of Pusionella Gray, 1847
 Surcula H. Adams & A. Adams, 1853: synonym of Turricula Schumacher, 1817
 Tomella Swainson, 1840: synonym of Tomellana Wenz, 1943
 †Trachelochetus Cossmann, 1889: synonym of †Clavatula (Trachelochetus) Cossmann, 1889 represented as Clavatula Lamarck, 1801
 Tyrrhenoturris Coen, 1929: synonym of Fusiturris Thiele, 1929

Ecology
Species from family Clavatulidae are omnivores, predators and scavengers.

References

External links
 Worldwide Mollusc Species Data Base: family Clavatulidae

 
Taxa named by John Edward Gray